Jayna is a female given name. It may refer to:

 Jayna Altman, a U.S. beauty queen
 Jayna Hefford (born 1977) a Canadian women's ice hockey player
 Jayna Murray (died 2011) a murder victim killed by a coworker at a Lululemon store in Bethesda, Maryland, USA

Fictional characters 
 Jayna, a DC Comics female superhero, member of the Wonder Twins
 Jayna-Zod, Jayna of the House of Zod, a DC Comics Metaverse character, female soldier from the TV series Krypton
 Jaynah, a character from Lona and Lapa

See also
 Jane (given name)
 Jayne (given name)
 Jaina (disambiguation)
 JNA (disambiguation)
 GNA (disambiguation)
 Gina (disambiguation)
 Jina (disambiguation)